Polsted is a surname. Notable people with the surname include:

Henry Polsted (by 1510–1555), MP for Guildford
Thomas Polsted, MP for Great Bedwyn
Richard Polsted, MP for Hindon